Pavlos Diakoulas (alternate spelling: Paul) is a retired Greek American professional basketball player and coach.

Professional playing career

Clubs
Diakoulas played professional basketball in the Greek League with Olympiacos Piraeus. He was a member of Olympiacos during their undefeated season in the Greek League, during the 1975–76 season. With Olympiacos, he played in all 3 of Europe's major European-wide club tournaments at the time. He played in the top-tier level FIBA European Champions Cup (now called EuroLeague, 1976–77, 1978–79), in the second-tier level FIBA Cup Winners' Cup (later called FIBA Saporta Cup, 1975–76, 1977–78), and in the third-tier level FIBA Korać Cup (1979–80).

He also played with Kolossos Rodou, in the Greek lower divisions, in the 1980s.

National team career
Diakoulas played in 30 games with the senior Greek national basketball team, scoring a total of 189 points, for a scoring average of 6.3 points per game. He was a member of Greece's senior national team at the EuroBasket 1975.

Coaching career
Diakoulas was the head coach of the Greek club Aigaleo.

Awards and accomplishments

As a player
2× Greek League Champion: (1976, 1978)
4× Greek Cup Winner: (1976, 1977, 1978, 1980)

References

External links
1975 FIBA European Championship Profile
FIBAEurope.com Profile
Basket.gr Profile 

1950 births
Living people
Aigaleo B.C. coaches
American men's basketball players
American people of Greek descent
Greek basketball coaches
Greek Basket League players
Greek men's basketball players
Kolossos Rodou B.C. players
Olympiacos B.C. players
Power forwards (basketball)
Small forwards